Delta Air Lines Flight 723 was a Douglas DC-9 twin-engine jetliner, operating as a scheduled domestic passenger flight from Burlington, Vermont to Logan International Airport in Boston, Massachusetts, with an intermediate stop in Manchester, New Hampshire. On July 31, 1973 at 11:08 AM, while on an instrument landing system (ILS) instrument approach into Logan in low clouds and fog, the aircraft descended below the glidepath, struck a seawall and crashed, killing all 89 occupants; two people initially survived, but later died of their injuries.

Aircraft and crew
The DC-9-31, registration  serial number 47075, was manufactured in September 1967 and had 14,639 flight hours at the time of the accident. The jetliner was one of the aircraft that Delta Air Lines acquired in their 1972 merger with Northeast Airlines, to whom the aircraft was originally delivered. The flight crew consisted of Captain John Streil (49) and First Officer Sidney Burrill (31). Captain Streil, a highly experienced pilot, had accumulated roughly 14,800 flight hours throughout his flying career. He had 17 years of experience as pilot-in-command and had been flying DC-9s since 1970, with 1,457 hours logged in them. First Officer Burrill was also an experienced airman, with just under 7,000 flight hours, including more than 200 hours on the DC-9. Occupying the cockpit jumpseat was a third pilot, Joseph Burrell (52), who was in training and was not yet qualified on the DC-9.

Accident sequence

As it was later revealed, the controller was busy handling a potential collision conflict between two other aircraft, and therefore neglected to clear Flight 723 for the approach. The flight crew had to ask the controller for approach clearance, which was immediately given, but by that time—more than a minute after the intercept vector had been issued—they were high and fast and almost over the outer marker. The aircraft was destroyed, killing 87 of its 89 occupants. One of the two survivors died after two hours, and the other, Leopold Chouinard, died of burn injuries on December 11, 1973; Chouinard is not listed by the National Transportation Safety Board (NTSB) as an official Delta 723 fatality due to requirements in the Code of Federal Regulations which, in 1973, defined a crash fatality as taking place within 7 days of an accident; the rule was subsequently changed in 2018, such that death must occur within 30 days of a crash.

Investigation
The NTSB investigated the accident and was able to retrieve both the cockpit voice recorder (CVR) and flight data recorder (FDR). The investigators concluded that, based on the retrieved flight data and simulations, the flight crew very likely operated the flight director improperly, inadvertently switching it into a "go around" mode during the final approach, instead of the appropriate approach mode. This caused confusion and additional pressure, and contributed to the unstablized approach and deviation from the glide path. According to the CVR, no altitude callouts were made by the crew during the final approach, as the aircraft descended below the glideslope and decision height, until it struck the seawall and crashed.

The board determined the following probable cause for the accident:...the failure of the flightcrew to monitor altitude and to recognize passage of the aircraft through the approach decision height during an unstabilized precision approach conducted in rapidly changing meteorological conditions. The unstabilized nature of the approach was due initially to the aircraft's passing the outer marker above the glide slope at an excessive airspeed and thereafter compounded by the flightcrew's preoccupation with the questionable information presented by the flight director system. The poor positioning of the flight for the approach was in part the result of nonstandard air traffic control services.

See also

 Asiana Airlines Flight 214 – Struck a seawall after descending under the glidepath on landing
Atlas Air Flight 3591 – An accident caused by inadvertently switching the aircraft into a go-around mode on approach
 China Airlines Flight 140 – An accident caused by inadvertently switching the aircraft into a go-around mode on final approach
Air China Flight 129, Garuda Indonesia Flight 152, Flydubai Flight 981, Air Inter Flight 148 and Dan Air Flight 1008, other CFIT accidents caused by ATC and pilot errors.

Notes

References

External links
 

1973 in Boston
Accidents and incidents involving the McDonnell Douglas DC-9
Airliner accidents and incidents in Massachusetts
Airliner accidents and incidents involving controlled flight into terrain
Airliner accidents and incidents caused by pilot error
Aviation accidents and incidents in the United States in 1973
723
July 1973 events in the United States
Logan International Airport
Aviation accidents and incidents caused by air traffic controller error
Disasters in Boston